Kyiv is the capital of Ukraine, also known by its Russian-based name Kiev. 

Kyiv or Kiev may also refer to:

Places
 Principality of Kiev, a successor of the Kievan Rus' state
 Kyiv Oblast, a province of Ukraine
 Kyiv District, Donetsk, a district in Donetsk, Ukraine
 Kyiv Peninsula, a peninsula in the Antarctic
 2171 Kiev, a minor planet

Music
 Kiev (band), an American indie rock band
 "Kyiv", a song by Tom Misch and Yussef Dayes from the 2020 album What Kinda Music

Radio stations
 KIEV-LP, Outlaw Country Radio FM radio station in Camas, Washington, US
 KRLA (former call letters: KIEV 870), a radio station in Los Angeles, California, US
 KROQ (1500 AM) (former call letters: KIEV 1500), a former radio station in Culver City, California, US

Food
 Chicken Kiev, a chicken-based dish
 Kiev Restaurant, a former restaurant in New York City

Other uses
 Kiev (brand), a Soviet-era brand of cameras
 Kiev (computer), a Soviet computer system of the mid-1950s
 Kiev class (disambiguation)
 Kiev-class aircraft carrier, a class of Soviet aircraft carriers commissioned in 1975
 Soviet aircraft carrier Kiev, the first ship of the class
 Kiev-class destroyer, a class of unfinished Soviet destroyers of 1939–41
 Kiev (ship), a list of ships named Kiev

See also
 Battle of Kyiv (disambiguation)
 
 
 Chievo, a district of Verona, Italy
 Kief, cannabis crystals
 Kief, North Dakota, US
 Kieve (disambiguation)
 Kijev Do, Bosnia and Herzegovina
 Kijevo (disambiguation)